The Queensland State League, often abbreviated to the QSL, was a men's semi-professional soccer league in the Australian state of Queensland. The league was created by the state's governing body, Football Queensland, in 2008, to fill the gap between the national league (A-League) and the various city and regional leagues in the State. It was replaced in 2013 by the National Premier League Queensland as part of a wider introduction of the National Premier Leagues across the Australian soccer league system.

The QSL was conducted across Queensland during the winter season and administered by Football Queensland. The league replaced the State Cup, which was held from 2004 to 2007 as an end-of-season tournament for teams representing the various regional zones. The QSL was intended as the showcase for the state's elite talent, to provide a pathway from club soccer to the national ranks and a means of bringing soccer more into the media spotlight. Sponsored by the Hyundai Motor Company the league was officially known as the Hyundai Queensland State League.

Clubs
Although the league involved no promotion or relegation to other leagues, its membership changed over the length of the league due to various reasons.  For season 2010, Olympic, Redlands City Devils and Logan United did not re-nominate to stay in the league (Olympic FC and Redlands City Devils elected to return to the Brisbane Premier League (BPL) competition and Logan United disbanded). Gold Coast Stars and Southern Cross United joined the league for the 2011 season, however Southern Cross United withdrew from the competition on 19 April 2011 after completing only six rounds of the 2011 season.

Premiers

Seasons

2012

2011

2010

2009

2008

References

External links 
 Hyundai Queensland State League official website
 Football Queensland official website
 Brisbane Strikers
 Bundaberg Spirit
 Capricorn Cougars
 Far North Queensland Bulls
 Gold Coast Stars
 North Queensland Razorbacks
 Olympic FC
 Southern Cross United
 Sunshine Coast FC
 Whitsunday Miners

Soccer leagues in Queensland